The Palazzo Donà a Sant'Aponal, also known as the Palazzo Donà or Palazzo Donà dalle Trezze,  is a Gothic-style palace located on the Canal Grande of Venice, between Palazzo Papadopoli and Palazzo Donà della Madoneta in the Sestiere of San Polo, Venice, Italy.

History
The palace was erected in the 14th century by the Zancani family; documents link it to this family in 1314.
It was reconstructed in the 15th century, and refurbished in the 17th century.

Bibliography
 

Donà a Sant'Aponal
Donà a Sant'Aponal
Gothic architecture in Venice